Soria is a province of central Spain, in the eastern part of the autonomous community of Castile and León. Most of the province is in the mountainous Sistema Ibérico area.

Demographics 

It is bordered by the provinces of La Rioja, Zaragoza, Guadalajara, Segovia, and Burgos. Soria is the least populous of all of Spain's provinces, with a density of around 9 inhabitants/km2—one of the lowest in the European Union. The average population density of provinces in Spain and European Union are 83.6 and 116 inhabitants per square km respectively. In comparison, the Soria province is less dense than some northern parts of the Nordic countries.
 
Of the province's population of 91,487 (2002), nearly 40% live in the capital, Soria. 26.7% of its population was above 65 years of age while the nation's average is 16.9%. There are 183 municipalities in Soria, of which nearly half are hamlets of under 100 people and of which only 12 have more than 1000 people. The cathedral town of the province is El Burgo de Osma.

Population development
The historical population is given in the following chart:

Economy
The province's most important agricultural products are cereals. In the 1950s there were a total of 70,000 hectares cultivated land, but excessive fragmentation and lack of mechanization resulted in a very low productivity. In 1960, while the agricultural sector accounted for 69% of workers in the province, 70% of farms were used exclusively for animal rearing. There are currently about 100,000 hectares of land in the province dedicated to the cultivation of wheat and other 100,000 hectares for barley cultivation.

The indigenous forest resources are also being exploited for timber, resin and collecting mushrooms. Marble quarries are located in Espejón while Sierra de Toranzo and Ólvega have iron mines. Magnetite sources are also being exploited in Borobia. The capital city Soria is an important tourist destination. While the agricultural sector has a very high contribution to GDP of the province, the industrial sector represents a small proportion, just over 20% of GDP. Apart from these the province also has important food, wood processing, furniture production and auxiliary automotive components industries.

Subdivision

Comarcas 

Soria has 183 municipalities divided in 10 comarcas:

 Comarca de Almazán
 Comarca de Berlanga
 Comarca de Burgo de Osma
 Comarca de Campo de Gómara
 Comarca de El Valle
 Comarca de Pinares
 Comarca de Soria
 Comarca de Tierras Altas
 Comarca del Moncayo
 Tierra de Medinaceli

Coat of arms
The province's coat of arms bears the motto Soria pura, cabeza de estremadura, which means "Soria the pure, head of the borderland", as Soria was centuries ago on the expanding borders between the northern Christian kingdoms and the territories then held by the Muslims.

Municipalities

Notes and references

External links